The Old Washington County Courthouse was the courthouse for Washington County, Utah from its completion in 1876 to 1960. Located in St. George, Utah, the courthouse is a two-story red brick structure with unusually thick walls. The  by  structure rests on a high basalt rock foundation that comprises the ground floor, and is capped by a pyramidal hipped roof with a prominent wood cupola.

The courthouse was listed on the National Register of Historic Places on September 22, 1970. The building is used for Chamber of Commerce offices and storage. The third-floor courtroom is used for lectures. The building may have been designed by William H. Folsom, who designed the similar but larger Salt Lake City Council Hall.

References

External links

Old County Courthouse at the Washington County Historical Society

Courthouses on the National Register of Historic Places in Utah
Government buildings completed in 1876
Buildings and structures in St. George, Utah
Historic American Buildings Survey in Utah
County courthouses in Utah
National Register of Historic Places in Washington County, Utah